Balimah is a village in Samote Union Council of Kallar Syedan Tehsil, Rawalpindi District in the Punjab Province of Pakistan.

References

External links
https://www.youtube.com/watch?v=UwENsC2IBQM
https://www.dailymotion.com/video/x12aa5d

Populated places in Kallar Syedan Tehsil
Villages in Samote union council